The 1922 Oklahoma A&M Aggies football team represented Oklahoma A&M College as a member of the Oklahoma Intercollegiate Conference (OIC) and the Southwest Conference (SWC) during  the 1922 college football season. This was the 22nd year of football at A&M and the second under John Maulbetsch. The Aggies played their home games at Lewis Field in Stillwater, Oklahoma. They finished the season 4–4–1 overall, 2–0 in OIC play, and 2–3 in the SWC play.

Schedule

† Tulsa states "Mutually agreed not to play the game," while Oklahoma State deems this a "mutual forfeit."

References

Oklahoma AandM
Oklahoma AandM
Oklahoma State Cowboys football seasons
Oklahoma AandM Aggies football